Panjapatti was former constituency in Tamil Nadu Legislative Assembly of Tamil Nadu a southern state of India. It was in Karur district and it was also part of Karur (Lok Sabha constituency).

Madras state

Election results

1962

1957

References

External links
 

Karur district
Former assembly constituencies of Tamil Nadu